The Women's points race competition at the 2018 UCI Track Cycling World Championships was held on 4 March 2018.

Results
100 laps (25 km) were raced with 10 sprints.

References

Women's points race
UCI Track Cycling World Championships – Women's points race